John Winchester Dana (June 21, 1808 – December 22, 1867) was an American businessman, diplomat and Democratic politician in the U.S. state of Maine. He served as the 19th and 21st Governor of Maine and as Chargé d'affaires to Bolivia during the 19th century.

Early life
Dana was born in Fryeburg (in modern-day Maine, then a part of Massachusetts), the son of Judah and Elizabeth Dana. He studied in the local schools and at Fryeburg Academy before pursuing a business career.

Political career
Dana served as a Democratic member of the Maine House of Representatives from 1841 to 1842. He was a member of the Maine State Senate from 1843 to 1844. and was elected president of the Maine State Senate. He became the Governor of Maine on January 3, 1844 after Acting Governor David Dunn resigned from office. He served only that day. As president of the state senate, Dana filled an unexpired term. Hugh J. Anderson became the Governor of Maine on the same day.

In 1846, Dana ran against Liberty Party candidate Samuel Fessenden and Whig Party candidate Daniel Bronson. No candidate received a majority of the vote; the Democratic dominated Legislature selected Dana. He was successful in his re-election bid in 1847 and 1848. During his term, anti-slavery measures were endorsed. He left office on May 8, 1850.

After leaving office, Dana returned to his business pursuits. He was appointed Chargé d'affaires to Bolivia in 1853 by President Franklin Pierce. On March 10, 1859, Dana resigned his position and returned to Maine to run for governor. He was defeated by Israel Washburn, Jr.

Later years
After losing the election, Dana sold his property and moved to South America to raise sheep. While assisting in a plague stricken area, Dana contracted cholera in Argentina and died near Buenos Aires. Years later he was re-interred in the Village Cemetery in Fryeburg, Maine.

Personal life
Dana married Eliza Ann Osgood and they had five children. Dana's father Judah Dana was a Maine statesman and U.S. Senator.

References

Further reading
 Sobel, Robert and John Raimo. Biographical Directory of the Governors of the United States, 1789-1978. Greenwood Press, 1988.

External links

National Governors Association
John W. Dana Portrait

1808 births
1867 deaths
Democratic Party governors of Maine
People from Fryeburg, Maine
Deaths from cholera
Ambassadors of the United States to Bolivia
Presidents of the Maine Senate
Democratic Party Maine state senators
Infectious disease deaths in Argentina
19th-century American diplomats
19th-century American politicians
Fryeburg Academy alumni